Mera Naam Karegi Roshan is an Indian television series that airs on Zee TV, based on the story of a daughter and her crusade against injustice and inequality. It debuted on 12 July 2010, but on 26 November 2010 it was announced that Mera Namm Karegi Roshan was canceled due to lack of ratings. The final episode aired on 9 December 2010. It was shot at Artisian and Nirman studio, Vasai (A Tribeni Group Venture).

Cast
Sana Sheikh / Amrapali Dubey ... Reet
Sufi Malhotra ... Yagya (Reet's husband)
Himani Shivpuri... Yagya's mother
Sahil Anand ... Bhisham 
Gautam Rode ... Samvad
Vikram Gokhale ... Thakur Veer Pratap Singh (Reet's father)
Kaushalya (Reet's mother)
Yashpal Sharma ... Kunwar Kuldeep Singh (Reet's elder brother)
Lubna Salim ... Yashoda (Kuldeep's wife)
Anirudh Dave... Rajveer Singh (Reet's second elder brother)
Sheetal Dabholkar ... Aishwarya (Rajveer's wife)
 ... Lochan 
Namrata Thapa Currentiya (Lochan's girlfriend)

References

External links
Mera Naam Karegi Roshan Official Site on Zee TV India

Zee TV original programming
Indian drama television series
2010 Indian television series debuts
2010 Indian television series endings
Hats Off Productions